Shoham (lit. onyx) is a town (local council) in the Central District of Israel. The name relates to one of the 12 stones on the Hoshen, the sacred breastplate worn by a Jewish high priest (Exodus 28:20), similar to other nearby towns: Nofekh, Bareket, Leshem and Ahlama (the former name of Beit Arif). Its jurisdiction is 5,889 dunams (~5.9 km2).

History
A plan to establish a town in the area that is now Shoham was first proposed in the 1960s, as an idea to establish a town for immigrants from South America. It was again proposed in the 1970s. However, residents of nearby moshavim wanted to build a rural community for the adult children of farmers in cooperative communities. In the early 1990s, Israeli Housing Minister Ariel Sharon put forward a new plan to create a town in the area. Construction began in 1993, when the first 300 homes were built. From then on, the town grew rapidly. By 1995, it had 3,100 residents, and by 2014, had reached a population of 20,000.

Character
Shoham is a middle-class town, and residency there is considered a status symbol in Israel. In terms of average wages and the rate of high school students who complete their matriculation, Shoham residents rank well above the national average. Its residential areas primarily have single-family homes with yards and duplexes, although there are a few apartment complexes. According to Haaretz, it has a small-town, community-oriented feel, but offers most of the services found in bedroom communities, including shopping centers, a high school, and a middle school. The environment is considered a top priority in Shoham, and each neighborhood has municipal gardens and green spaces. The town's parks and gardens cover over 400 dunams, and are dotted with sculptures. The town has a performing arts center, sports facilities, a public library, and a retiree center and activity club.

Politics
Mayors of Shoham:
Dov Shayish, 1993–1998 (appointed)
Shachar Ben Ami, 1998–2003
Gil Livneh, 2003–2018
Eitan Patigro, 2018–present

Education
In the 2009–2010 school year, Shoham ranked top in the country in percentage of high school students passing the Bagrut matriculation exams. In the 2014-2015 school year, 88.1% of high school students matriculated. About half of the municipal budget is dedicated to education.

Notable residents

Matan Baltaxa, footballer
Ziv Bar-Joseph, computational biologist
Haim Katz, politician
Moshe Mizrahi, politician
Dan Naveh, politician 
Lonah Chemtai Salpeter, Kenyan-Israeli Olympic marathon runner
David Stav, rabbi
Ella Lee Lahav, singer
Tamir Saban, basketball player

References

External links
 

Local councils in Central District (Israel)
Populated places established in 1993
1993 establishments in Israel